Richard James Hardy Stanbury (May 2, 1923 – July 21, 2014) was a Canadian lawyer and politician. Stanbury was a Senator from February 1968 to May 1998 who also served as president of the Liberal Party of Canada from 1968 to 1973.

Before his appointment to the Senate on the advice of Lester Pearson in February 1968, Stanbury was a lawyer and organizer for the Presbyterian Church in Canada. He became active in Liberal politics and was the riding association president in York Centre in the early 1960s and later became president of the Toronto and York Liberal Association, served on the National Liberal Campaign Committee and chaired the National Policy Committee of the Liberal Party. Shortly after being summoned to the Senate, Stanbury was elected president of the Liberal Party at the same convention that selected Pierre Trudeau as party leader.

During his tenure as president, Stanbury successfully argued that the party join the Liberal International.

Stanbury's brother was Liberal MP and lawyer Robert Stanbury.

Archives 
There is a Richard Stanbury fonds at Library and Archives Canada.

References

 

Canadian senators from Ontario
Canadian political consultants
Canadian Presbyterians
Liberal Party of Canada senators
Presidents of the Liberal Party of Canada
1923 births
2014 deaths